Monteiasi (locally ) is a town and comune in the Taranto province in the Apulia region of southeast Italy. Monteiasi was historically an  Arbëreshë settlement. After the inhabitants abandoned the Albanian Greek Orthodox faith they assimilated into the local population.

Physical geography 
Monteiasi is located in the Mediterranean landscape, characterized by olive trees and vineyards.

History 
Around the 16th century, a large group of Albanian refugees coming from the Balkans during the conquest of the latter by the Ottoman Empire settled in Monteiasi. At the end of same century, it was forced to leave their houses, because the archbishops of Taranto abandoned the Greek rite.

Toponymy 
There are different interpretations regarding the origin of the name, however, they do not have any documentary evidence, contrary to what local people supposed.
According to the most widespread opinion, the name "Monteiasi" derives from the ancient Greek compound 'monos tiasos' (literally 'sacred area'). Indeed various fragments of statuettes used for the worship of Dionysus were found in the countryside. Other interpretations claim that "Tiasì" means a series of dances performed by local farmers in honor of the god Bacchus, over time these dances were associated with the traditional taranta dance. From the standpoint of historians, the toponym derives from the devotion to Saint Blaise, 'mons Blasi' (Monte di Biagio). Further sources believe that the name is attributable to its geographical position: "inter montes" (among the mountains). Since it is located between the small hills whence Montemesola, Monteparano, and Grottaglie rise. Moreover, its origins may be traced back to the "Palummara" farm, located to the west of the town, which shows its story through the archaeological complex from the Neolithic to the Roman conquest.

Dialect 
Monteiasi dialect is similar to Salentino dialect, but it is also similar to Tarantino dialect.

References 

Cities and towns in Apulia
Localities of Salento
Arbëresh settlements